Lethbridge is a city in Alberta, Canada.

Lethbridge may also refer to:

Places
 Lethbridge, Victoria, a township outside Geelong, Victoria, Australia
 Lethbridge, Newfoundland and Labrador, a community in Canada
 Lethbridge County, a municipal district in Alberta, Canada

Canadian electoral districts
 Lethbridge (electoral district), federal electoral district in Canada
 Lethbridge-West, provincial electoral district
 Lethbridge-East, provincial electoral district
 Lethbridge (provincial electoral district), defunct Alberta provincial electoral district
 Lethbridge City, defunct provincial electoral district
 Lethbridge District, defunct provincial electoral district

Education
 University of Lethbridge, Lethbridge, Alberta
 Lethbridge College, Lethbridge, Alberta
 Lethbridge Collegiate Institute, Lethbridge, Alberta
 Lethbridge School, Swindon, England

Other uses
 Lethbridge (surname)
 Lethbridge (band), an Australian R&B group

See also
Brigadier Lethbridge-Stewart (Doctor Who character)